Hawfields Presbyterian Church is a historic Presbyterian church complex located near Mebane, Alamance County, North Carolina. The congregation was established by settlers in the 1700s. The complex consists of the original church building, the classroom to the rear of it, the Session House, and the cemetery. The current Greek Revival style brick church building was constructed between 1852 and 1855.

It was added to the National Register of Historic Places in 1978.

In the cemetery "a plaque...hangs 'in memory of the faithful slaves' who once worshipped there and are buried nearby."

David Ealy has served as the church's pastor since October, 2010.

References

External links

Official website

Presbyterian churches in North Carolina
Churches on the National Register of Historic Places in North Carolina
Churches completed in 1855
19th-century Presbyterian church buildings in the United States
Churches in Mebane, North Carolina
National Register of Historic Places in Alamance County, North Carolina